Ölbach may refer to:

Ölbach (Berkel), a river of North Rhine-Westphalia, Germany, tributary of the Berkel
Ölbach (Wapelbach), a river of North Rhine-Westphalia, Germany, tributary of the Wapelbach